Dániel Zwickl (born 30 August 1984 in Budapest) is a Hungarian table tennis player. He competed at the 2012 Summer Olympics in the Men's singles, but was defeated in the third round.

References

Hungarian male table tennis players
Living people
Olympic table tennis players of Hungary
Table tennis players at the 2012 Summer Olympics
1984 births
Table tennis players from Budapest
21st-century Hungarian people